John Kennedy (23 May 1931 – 13 July 1989) was a British professional racing cyclist. He rode in the 1960 Tour de France.

References

External links
 

1931 births
1989 deaths
British male cyclists
Cyclists from Glasgow
20th-century British people